"Bulletproof" is a song by Swedish singer Dotter. The song was performed for the first time in Melodifestivalen 2020, where it finished in second place, one point below the winner. It peaked at number 2 on the Swedish single chart.

Charts

Weekly charts

Year-end charts

Certifications

References

2020 singles
English-language Swedish songs
Melodifestivalen songs of 2020
Dotter songs
Songs written by Dotter (singer)